Sweet Tree Holdings is a Vermont, United States, company that produces maple products from a sugarbush and processing facility in Island Pond.

The company was founded in 2013, and the following year spent $700,000 to purchase a vacant building, formerly a furniture factory for Ethan Allen, in Island Pond.  Ahead of the 2015 sugaring season, the company purchased 7,000 acres of forest near Island Pond, at a cost of $5.5 million, and installed over 90,000 taps.  During the company's first year producing syrup, it produced 35,000 gallons of syrup, which was stored on site while it worked to find and develop a market.

By the 2016 season, Sweet Tree had installed 200,000 taps on 24,000 acres of land, though it continued to store its syrup.  It introduced a trademarked brand, Maple Guild, under which it planned to sell, in addition to pure syrup, value-added maple products such as waters, teas, and flavored syrups.  At full build-out, Sweet Tree plans to be the largest maple producer in the United States, with around 500,000 taps.

References

Drink companies of the United States
Island Pond, Vermont
Food and drink companies based in Vermont
American companies established in 2013